The Rugby World Cup host nation is selected by World Rugby at a meeting six years before each tournament. Each of the Rugby World Cups from 1987 to 2015 were hosted by countries that are considered the traditional powers in World Rugby. The first non Rugby Championship or Six Nations country to host a Rugby World Cup was Japan in 2019, after failed bids for the 2011 (awarded to New Zealand) and 2015 (awarded to England) tournaments.

Current criteria 
World Rugby requires for a country to host a Rugby World Cup, it must possess the necessary facilities. Stadiums must have a capacity at least 15,000, with the stadium for the final having a capacity of at least 60,000. The stadiums have other requirements, such as pitch size and floodlighting.

World Rugby also looks for hosts that will either generate significant revenue or hosts that will spread the geographic reach of the sport. According to World Rugby Chairman Bernard Lapasset in 2008:
"As the revenue generation is vital to our ongoing development plans, we recognise that the World Cup has to be held in one of our senior core markets on a regular basis . . . However, the commercial success of the tournament also means we can now consider placing the tournament in new developing markets to assist the game's strategic growth."

World Rugby also tends to rotate continents, with no continent to date hosting two consecutive World Cups.

Summary

Hosts by tournament

1987: New Zealand and Australia
The first Rugby World Cup was hosted by Australia and New Zealand after the Australian Rugby Union and the New Zealand Rugby Union each independently wrote to the International Rugby Board seeking to conduct a World Cup tournament. The final was played in Auckland, New Zealand at Eden Park and won by New Zealand.

1991: England, Ireland, Wales, France and Scotland
The 1991 Rugby World Cup was jointly hosted by England, Ireland, Wales, France and Scotland, with games played all over these five European nations. Pool A, in which England played, saw half of the matches played in London, though games were also in Leicester, Gloucester and Otley. Pool B games involved European nations Scotland and Ireland, which had all their games in either Dublin or Edinburgh; one game was played in Belfast. Pool C included Wales, whose games were all played in Cardiff, with the other games in Pontypool, Pontypridd, and Llanelli. Pool D, of which France were a part, saw games played in Agen, Bayonne, Béziers Brive, Grenoble, and Toulouse. None of the quarter-finals or semi-finals was played in England. The final was played at the Rugby Football Union's Twickenham.

1995: South Africa
The 1995 World Cup was hosted and won by South Africa. The IRB broke new ground by awarding the tournament to an African nation, making it the first major sporting event ever held on the continent. This was also the first Rugby World Cup to be played entirely in one country.

The tournament is most remembered for two moments—the emergence of Jonah Lomu as a rugby superstar, and the trophy presentation. In one of the most emotional moments in sports history, President Nelson Mandela wore a Springbok jersey and matching baseball cap when presenting the trophy to the team's Afrikaner captain Francois Pienaar. Mandela's jersey had Pienaar's number 6 on the back. The presentation was widely seen as a sign of reconciliation between South Africa's black and white communities.

1999: Wales
The 1999 World Cup was hosted by Wales with some matches spread across Scotland, England, Ireland and France. The format of the pool games was similar to the 1991 World Cup in England. All Pool A games were held in Scotland, Pool B games in England, Pool C games in France, Pool D games were all held in Wales and Pool E games were all held in Ireland. Second round play-offs and the quarter-finals were held a variety of European venues, the semi-finals were held at Twickenham Stadium, London. The third place play-off and the final were held at the new Millennium Stadium in Cardiff.

2003: Australia

The 2003 Cup was intended to be held jointly by Australia and New Zealand, but disagreements between the International Rugby Board and the NZRU, over sponsorship, advertising and ticketing, saw the competition played solely in Australia. This was the first and only tournament to date to be won by a team from the northern hemisphere. The 2003 World Cup saw matches played in eleven stadia in ten Australian cities.

2007: France

Unlike the previous tournaments in 1991 and 1999 where five countries in Europe hosted matches, the IRB decided to award the right to host the 2007 tournament to one country.

Both England and France bid to host the tournament. England's bid included a two-tier tournament – a 16 team format, and a separate Nations Cup for emerging countries – and altering the structure of the qualifying tournament. France's bid had a traditional 20-team format to be held in September and October.

The IRB announced in April 2003 that France had won the right to host the tournament. The French bid won with 18 out of 21 votes, with IRB Chairman Syd Millar stating that "The council was overwhelmingly of the view that the structure should remain as it is." The tournament was moved to the proposed September–October dates with the tournament structure remaining as it was. It was also announced that ten French cities would be hosting games, with the final at the Stade de France.

2011: New Zealand

New Zealand, Japan, and South Africa bid to host the tournament. South Africa was eliminated in the first round of IRB voting; in the second round, New Zealand won the vote 13 to 8, and the IRB Council awarded the hosting of the 2011 Rugby World Cup to New Zealand. The bidding occurred in November 2005, the first time that hosting rights had been awarded to a nation six years in advance. The voting procedure was managed by a team of independent auditors.

Some bookmakers had initially made Japan the favourite to win the vote, reasoning that it was believed there was a desire to take the Rugby World Cup to a non-traditional rugby nation, and host the event in Asia for the first time. 

There were also concerns about New Zealand's infrastructure, however an IRB fact-finding mission impressed the executives.

South Africa had initially explored the possibility of inviting other African countries to stage some matches, and South Africa had also discussed with Argentina the possibility of hosting some matches in Buenos Aires. Ultimately, however, South Africa submitted a solo bid.

Additionally, the United States were discussed in the media as a country that might submit a bid, but the United States did not bid.

Japan responded critically to the IRB's decision to award the 2011 World Cup to New Zealand, with the Japanese RFU chief Yoshiro Mori declaring:
"The established nations pass the ball around their friends . . . Only the interests of the bigger unions remain."
Despite not winning the right to host the 2011 World Cup, Japan Rugby officials remained optimistic about future opportunities.
Japan Rugby stated: "We want to help with the spread of rugby fever . . . and we believe that dispersing rugby fever in the biggest continent on the planet will help the IRB in their mission of globalizing the game we all love."

The IRB defended its decision to award the 2011 World Cup to New Zealand instead of Japan, stating: "New Zealand can guarantee packed stadiums and that can't be guaranteed in Japan."

2015: England

The host for the 2015 tournament was England, who won their bid on 28 July 2009. A record ten unions indicated formal interest in hosting the 2015 and/or the 2019 events: Australia, England, Ireland, Italy, Jamaica, Japan, Russia, Scotland, South Africa and Wales. Argentina had been reported in early 2008 as having given preliminary consideration to bidding, but did not ultimately formally indicate an interest in bidding.

2019: Japan 

The host for the 2019 tournament was Japan, who won the right to host the tournament on 28 July 2009.

2023: France 

Several countries declared their interest in hosting the 2023 Rugby World Cup, including ones that have already hosted RWC matches and countries looking to host a tournament for the first time.

South Africa was considered one of the front runners to host the 2023 competition, having bid unsuccessfully for the right to host the 2011, 2015 and 2019 tournaments. Ireland submitted a formal bid, following the January 2014 establishment of a government taskforce to assess a bid to host the Rugby World Cup. Previous host nation France also submitted a bid to host again in 2023.

The United States, Argentina, and Italy had also expressed interest in hosting, but none of the three counties submitted a formal bid.

On 15 November 2017, it was announced that France had beaten rivals Ireland and South Africa, in its successful bid to host the 2023 Rugby World Cup.

2027: Australia 
The host for the 2027 tournament will be Australia, confirmed on the 12th May, 2022.

2031: United States 
The host for the 2031 tournament will be the United States, confirmed on the 12th May, 2022.

Notes

References

External links
 New Zealand to host RWC 2011
 Joint Rugby World Cup bid office set up
 NZ Wins Bid To Host 2011 Rugby World Cup
 Japan Rugby news on bid

Rugby World Cup